The murder of Nicole Sauvain-Weisskopf, a Swiss national on holiday in Thailand, occurred in Phuket, Thailand in August 2021. She was found dead at Ao Yon waterfall, a popular tourist destination, and thought to have been dead 3 days prior to discovery of the corpse. She was found wearing only a t-shirt and jacket and covered by a black tarp. Police have stated there were signs of rape.

Sauvain-Weisskopf had been admitted into Phuket under a pilot programme to not have to undergo quarantine but was not allowed to leave the Phuket area.

Thai police said on 7 August 2021, they had arrested a 27 year old Phuket man for the killing. Theerawut Tortip admitted to police that he stole from her and killed her. He was seen on CCTV footage going to the waterfall at the same time as Sauvain-Weisskopf.

Bio
Sauvain-Weisskopf was admitted into Phuket under the Phuket Sandbox, a pilot programme for allowing tourists into the country. She was a deputy protocol chief of the Federal Assembly of Switzerland in Germany.

Crime
She was wearing shorts and a t-shirt. Terrawat became sexually aroused. He grabbed her in a chokehold and held her head underwater. He dragged her out of the water, stripped her shirt and shorts off. He saw her darkened face and swollen tongue resulting in him losing his erection. He then used black plastic to cover her body. Then he went through her purse and stole Baht 300.

Guilty verdict
Teerawat Thotip was sentenced to death. His death sentence was commuted to life in prison.  The attempted rape charge was dismissed. The sentencing was broadcast on Google Meet.

References

2021 murders in Thailand
Nicole Sauvain-Weisskopf
Tourist murders in Thailand